Toluca Car Assembly is a   Chrysler automobile factory in Toluca, State of Mexico, Mexico.  It opened in 1968.  Toluca Stamping is located nearby.

DaimlerChrysler announced a US$1 billion investment in the plant in March 2006 creating a flexible manufacturing system (FMS) to allow simultaneous production of vehicles of differing platforms.  The plant currently assembles the Jeep Compass for the North and Latin American markets.

The expanded Chrysler Park adjoins the plant and represents a joint venture of eight outside suppliers, including TRW, Magna Intier, IPO, Seglo, HBPO, Android, Brose and Gestamp.

Products

Current

Jeep Compass (2016-Present)

Past
Fiat 500 (2011–2019)
Fiat Freemont (2011–2016)
Dodge Journey (2009–2020)
Chrysler PT Cruiser (2001-2010)
Chrysler Sebring (1995-2000) convertible only.
Chrysler Cirrus (1995-2000)
Chrysler/Dodge/Plymouth Neon (1994-2005) 4 door sedan only.
Plymouth Acclaim (1989-1995)
Dodge Spirit (1989-1995)
Dodge Stratus and Plymouth Breeze (1995-2000)
Dodge Shadow and Plymouth Sundance (1987-1994)
Dodge 600 sedans (1986-1989). Marketed as Dart by Chrysler.
Dodge Aries & Plymouth Reliant sedans, coupés and wagons (1981-1989). Marketed as Dodge Dart K and Valiant Volare K.
Dodge Magnum (1981-1988)
Chrysler LeBaron sedans, coupés and wagons (1977-1995). Marketed as Chrysler LeBaron and Chrysler 600 (only 4 door sedan. 1984 and 1985)
Dodge Diplomat sedans, coupés and wagons (1980-1982). Marketed as Dodge Dart.
Plymouth Volare coupé. Marketed as Valiant Volare. Plymouth Volare front, Dodge Diplomat rear.
Dodge Aspen & Plymouth Volare sedans, coupés and wagons (1976-1980). Marketed as Dodge Dart, Valiant Volare and Valiant Super Bee. (the two later only as coupés)
Dodge Dart sedans and coupés (1968-1976). Marketed as Dodge Dart, Valiant and Dodge Super Bee.
Plymouth Valiant coupés (1968-1976). Marketed as Valiant.
Plymouth Valiant sedans (1968-1970). Marketed as Valiant.

References

Chrysler factories
Motor vehicle assembly plants in Mexico